Milburn Peak, is a 2,019-metre (6,624-feet) mountain in the Murray Range of the Hart Ranges in Northern British Columbia.

Named after Royal Canadian Air Force Flying Officer Philip Giles Milburn, from Prince George, BC.  Flying Officer Milburn served as a Lancaster pilot with No. 550 (RAF) Squadron and was killed in action 23 April 1944, age 23.

Reference 

Northern Interior of British Columbia
Canadian Rockies
Two-thousanders of British Columbia
Royal Canadian Air Force personnel of World War II
Cariboo Land District